This is a list of museums in Myanmar (also known as Burma).

For museums in Yangon, see List of museums in Yangon.

Chin State Cultural Museum
Kachin State Cultural Museum
Kayah State Cultural Museum
Kayin State Cultural Museum
Mandalay Cultural Museum
Mon State Cultural Museum
Museum of Shan Sawbwa
National Museum (Naypyidaw)
Pathein Cultural Museum
Rakhine State Cultural Museum
Shan State Cultural Museum
Shan State Cultural Museum
Taungdwingyi Cultural Museum
UBS Mayu

See also
 Tourism in Myanmar
 Culture of Myanmar
 List of museums

Museums
 
Museums
Myanmar
Museums
Myanmar